Piano Sonata No. 4 may refer to:

 Piano Sonata No. 4 (Beethoven)
 Piano Sonata No. 4 (Mozart)
 Piano Sonata No. 4 (Prokofiev)
 Piano Sonata No. 4 (Scriabin)